Patterson v. Alabama, 294 U.S. 600 (1935), was a United States Supreme Court case which held that an African-American defendant is denied due process rights if the jury pool excludes African-Americans.

Background
This case was the second landmark decision arising out of the Scottsboro Boys trials (the first was the 1932 case, Powell v. Alabama).   Haywood Patterson, along with several other African-American defendants, were tried for raping two white women in 1931 in Scottsboro, Alabama.  The trials were rushed, there was virtually no legal counsel, and no African-Americans were permitted in the jury.  All defendants, including Patterson, were convicted.  The Communist Party of the United States assisted the defendants and appealed to the Supreme Court, which overturned the convictions in 1932 (in the Powell v. Alabama decision) due to lack of legal counsel.

A second set of trials was then held in Decatur, Alabama.   In spite of lack of evidence, the jury sentenced Patterson to death in the electric chair.  Judge James Edwin Horton overturned the verdict, and a third trial was held in 1933.  The third trial also resulted in a death penalty verdict.  No African Americans were included in any of the juries, nor were any ever considered for jury duty in Alabama.  This decision was appealed to the Supreme Court, on the basis that the absence of African Americans from the jury pool denied the defendants due process.

The Supreme Court agreed, and the convictions were overturned.

In 1936, the defendants were tried, some for the fourth time, again for rape.  In this trial, the verdicts were again guilty, but sentences were long prison terms rather than the death penalty.

Notes and references

External links
 
 
  Norris v. Alabama - 294 U.S. 587 (1935)
 

1935 in United States case law
American Civil Liberties Union litigation
Civil rights movement case law
United States Supreme Court cases
United States Supreme Court cases of the Hughes Court
African-American history of Alabama
1935 in Alabama
Legal history of Alabama
United States racial discrimination case law